Viktor Freiherr von Weizsäcker (21 April 1886, in Stuttgart – 9 January 1957, in Heidelberg) was a German physician and physiologist. He was the brother of Ernst von Weizsäcker, and uncle to Richard von Weizsäcker and Carl Friedrich von Weizsäcker. (For his family tree, see Weizsäcker.)

He studied at Tübingen, Freiburg, Berlin, and Heidelberg, where he earned his medical degree in 1910. In 1920 he became head of the neurological department at Ludolf von Krehl's clinic in Heidelberg. In 1941 he succeeded Otfrid Foerster as professor of neurology in Breslau, and in 1945 returned to Heidelberg as a professor of clinical medicine.

Weizsäcker is known for his pioneer work in psychosomatic medicine, and for his theories regarding medical anthropology. He is remembered for his concept of Gestaltkreis, an elaboration of Gestalt psychology, in which he explains that biological events are not fixed responses, but are dependent upon previous experience and are constantly being repatterned through experience. Via Gestalt, Weizsäcker attempted to represent the unit of perception and movement theoretically.

In the late 1920s Weizsäcker was co-editor of Die Kreatur with philosopher Martin Buber (1878-1965) and theologian Joseph Wittig (1879-1949). In this journal, Weizsäcker advances his ideas concerning medical anthropology. In 1956 he published Pathosophie, where he tries to create a philosophical understanding of man through his drives, conflicts, and illnesses.

Published works 
 "Der Gestaltkreis, Theorie der Einheit von Wahrnehmen und Bewegen", 1940.
 "Gestalt und Zeit : nach einem am 17. 1. 1942 gehaltenen Vortrage", 1942.
 "Begegnungen und Entscheidungen", 1949.
 "Menschenführung : nach ihren biologischen und metaphysischen Grundlagen betrachtet", 1955.
 "Am Anfang schuf Gott Himmel und Erde : Grundfragen der Naturphilosophie", 1954.
 "Natur und Geist; Errinnerungen eines Arztes", 1954.
 "Pathosophie", 1955.
 Books about Viktor von Weizsäcker:
 "Viktor von Weizsäcker (1886-1957) : Materialien zu Leben und Werk" : (Dokumentationsband zur Ausstellung; Heidelberg, 28. April-6. Mai 1986) Berlin u.a : Springer, 1986.
 "Viktor von Weizsäckers Rezeption der Psychoanalyse" by Thomas Reuster; Stuttgart-Bad Cannstatt : Frommann-Holzboog, 1990.
 "Der Arztphilosoph Viktor von Weizsäcker : Leben und Werk im Überblick" by Udo Benzenhöfer Göttingen : Vandenhoeck & Ruprecht, 2007.
 Alle origini dell'antropologia medica. Il pensiero di Viktor von Weizsäcker, by Oreste Tolone: Carocci, Roma 2016.

References 
 This article is based on a translation of an equivalent article at the German Wikipedia.

German neurologists
Viktor von
University of Tübingen alumni
Heidelberg University alumni
1886 births
1957 deaths
German physiologists
Academic staff of the University of Breslau
Academic staff of Heidelberg University